Rothschildia erycina, or Rothschild's silk moth, is a moth of the family Saturniidae first described by George Shaw in 1796. It is found from Mexico to Brazil and Paraguay. The habitat is tropical rainforest and wet savannah. It is found on altitudes of up to 1,200 meters above sea level.

The larvae feed on Ailanthus altissima, Coutarea, Exostema, Ligustrum,  Antonia, Cenostigma, Chiococca and Dodonaea species. The larval stage lasts about 40 days. Pupation takes place in a large silken cocoon. The pupal stage lasts 3 to 4 weeks.

Subspecies
Rothschildia erycina erycina
Rothschildia erycina mexicana Draudt, 1929 (Mexico)
Rothschildia erycina nigrescens Rothschild, 1907 (Costa Rica to Ecuador)

erycina
Moths described in 1796
Taxa named by George Shaw